Genius Junior is an American television game show that debuted on March 18, 2018 on NBC, during the 2017–18 season. In March 2017, NBC ordered ten episodes for the first season of the series, which was hosted by Neil Patrick Harris. The series shows children, aged 12 and under, competing in teams of three in five increasingly difficult rounds. Each round tested the teams in various subjects including spelling, mathematics and memory. The winning team received the "Genius Junior Grant".

Gameplay
Genius Junior is a tournament game show in which only the winners will advance and win the cash.

Main Game
Each show sees two teams of three kids compete in a series of brain-teasing, thought-provoking challenges. In each round, each team will play their half of the round against the clock. Harris will read a series of questions based on the round's criteria and the team in control will take turns answering them. Each correct answer scores one point. Each player can pass their turn if they don't know the answer, but each player can only do it once each round.

Before the second and third rounds, each team will have the option to nominate a player to be the "Super Brain". The nomination is made by the player hitting a buzzer in front of them. When this is done, that player will play the round alone, trying to answer as many questions and racking up as many points as they can. The "Super brain" option is only available to each team once.

At the end of the game, the team with the most points wins and will go on to face "The Cortex" for up to $100,000.

Games

Human GPS
The contestants are asked questions about locations. In the quarterfinals, the questions are about streets or stations in U.S. cities. In the semifinals, the questions are about vehicles or the human body. In the quarterfinals and semi-finals, the contestants have 90 seconds to answer, in the finals, they have 60 seconds. In the finals, the questions are about stars and constellations. In the finals, the Team in 3rd Place is eliminated.

Number Cruncher
The contestants are given math problems which get longer with each subsequent question and will not be able to see the numbers. The answer to the last question is the first number to the next question. In the quarterfinals, the contestants are given problems with possible addition, subtraction, multiplication, and division combinations. In the semifinals, the contestants are given all the numbers and are then told whether to add, subtract, multiply, or divide. In the finals, the problems will include squares, cubes, square roots, and/or cube roots.

Talking Dictionary
The contestants must spell words backwards. In the quarterfinals, the contestants must simply spell each word backwards. In the semifinals, the contestants are given the words without the vowels and must decipher them before spelling them backwards. In the finals, the contestants may be told to simply spell each word backwards, spell the word backwards using only consonants, or spell the word backwards using only vowels.

Memory Master
The contestants must remember the order of a standard deck of playing cards. In the quarterfinals, the contestants must remember one deck of cards starting with the first card. In the semifinals, the contestants must remember two decks of cards starting with the last card. In the event of a tie, the contestants must nominate one person on their team to answer a tie breaker question based on the cards they memorized, whoever answers correctly first, wins. Whoever buzzes In first will have 5 seconds to answer. The game isn’t played in the finals.

The Cortex
The winning team stands at a hexagonal area to play the final round. They'll have three minutes to complete the round and win the money. This round has three levels of gameplay. Each player will have their own level and stand on a path with a brain button at the end. Like before, Harris will read a series of questions and this time, each correct answer wins money and goes one step. As soon as the player in control reaches the end, s/he will have completed the level and make that indication by hitting the brain button and pass the action to the next player. Here's how the progress works:

If the winning team can answer 12 questions correctly within those three minutes (3:00), their winnings will be doubled for a grand total of $100,000.

In the finals, the top 2 teams have two minutes plus one second for each point earned in the first three rounds and all the dollar values are doubled for a possible grand total of $200,000. The team that answers twelve questions correctly in the shortest length of time or that answers the most questions correctly wins.

Tournament format
For the first six weeks, the twelve teams (two teams each game) fought for a spot in the semi-finals. The six winning teams advanced to the semi-finals for a spot in the finals for the "Genius Junior Grant". The losing semifinalists as well as the third-place finalists won a trip to Universal Orlando Resort while the runner-up finalists won a trip to Washington, D.C.

International versions

Episodes

References

External links
 

2010s American children's game shows
2018 American television series debuts
NBC original programming
English-language television shows
Television series by Warner Bros. Television Studios